Yermolayev and Yermolayeva (feminine) is a Russian surname.

Derivation
Yermolayev is derived from the given name Yermolay (or Ermolai, Ermolay, Yermolai), which was from the Greek Hermolaos, meaning "the people of Hermes".

Alternative variants
"Yermolayev" may also alternatively be spelled or romanized as follows:
Ermolaeff
Ermolaev
Ermolajew
Ermolayev
Iermolaïev
Jermolajeff
Jermolajev
Jermolajew
Yermolaeff
Yermolaev
Yermolaieff
Yermolaiev
Yermolaiew

Notable people
Notable people with this surname include:
Galina Yermolayeva (rower) (b. 1948), Soviet rower
Aleksey Yermolayev (1910-1975), Soviet ballet dancer
Vadim Yermolayev, Russian ice hockey player
Vladimir Yermolaev (1909-1944), Soviet aircraft designer

See also
Yermolaev Design Bureau
Yermolayev Yer-2

References

Russian-language surnames